Andrew Eusebe (born 5 March 1985) is a West Indian cricketer. Eusebe is a right-handed batsman who bowls right-arm medium pace.

In February 2008, the United States Virgin Islands were invited to take part in the 2008 Stanford 20/20, whose matches held official Twenty20 status. Eusebe made two appearances in the tournament, in a preliminary round victory against St Kitts where he took the wicket of Jason Saddler to take figures of 1/30, and in a first-round defeat against Antigua and Barbuda. He wasn't required to bat in either match.

References

External links
Andrew Eusebe at ESPNcricinfo
Andrew Eusebe at CricketArchive

1985 births
Living people
United States Virgin Islands cricketers